Despite Everything is a popular 2019 Spanish comedy film directed by Gabriela Tagliavini and starring Blanca Suárez, Macarena García, Amaia Salamanca, and Belén Cuesta . The film premiered at the Málaga Film Festival on 16 March 2019, and released on Netflix on 3 May 2019, and was the most watched Netflix Original Spanish Film that year.

Plot
Before the reading of their mother's will, four estranged sisters find out that the man they've known as their father is not and each one has a different father. Their mother, Carmen, left a video testament in which she reveals her secret, and as a last wish and condition of receiving their inheritance tells her daughters to find their biological fathers, providing only the names of her former lovers. However, if one of them chooses not to do so, the inheritance is forfeited for all.

The siblings live separate lives and are opposites of each other. Sara is an accomplished magazine editor in New York City; Lucia, the youngest, is a discontented nonconformist engaging in sexual escapades; Sofía is an artist and lesbian with commitment issues; and Claudia is conservative, hiding that her husband left her and coping with it by popping pills and drinking wine excessively. Compelled to tolerate each other, the four embark on a road trip to procure DNA samples of the men, discover their fathers, and claim their inheritance.

Cast

References

External links
 
 
 

2019 films
2019 comedy films
2019 LGBT-related films
Spanish comedy films
2010s Spanish-language films
Spanish LGBT-related films
Films about infidelity
Films about sisters
Lesbian-related films
Films shot in Madrid
Spanish-language Netflix original films
LGBT-related comedy films
Bambú Producciones films
2010s Spanish films